Daniel Willett Foster (March 4, 1930 – January 25, 2018) was the John Denis McGarry, Ph.D. Distinguished Chair in Diabetes and Metabolic Research and Professor of Internal Medicine at the University of Texas Southwestern Medical School at Dallas.  He was Chairman of the Department of Internal Medicine for 16 years.  He was a Fellow of the American Academy of Arts and Sciences, a Fellow of the American Association for the Advancement of Science and a member of the Institute of Medicine of the National Academies.  He was a Master of the American College of Physicians.  He was also a former member of the President's Council on Bioethics.

Career in medicine 
Foster's research focused for many years on the intermediary metabolism of carbohydrates and lipids.  With his colleague, J. Denis McGarry, he discovered the malonyl-CoA regulatory system for fatty acid oxidation and ketogenesis.  Awards have included the Banting Medal (1984), the Joslin Medal (1984), the Founders Medal of the Southern Society for Clinical Investigation (1992) and the Lukens Award (1993).  He has been named the Outstanding Clinician in the Field of Diabetes and Outstanding Physician Educator in the Field of Diabetes by the American Diabetes Association.  He received the Robert H. Williams Distinguished Chair of Medicine Award of the Association of Professors of Medicine in February 2001. He was named Great Teacher by the National Institutes of Health in 2002.

Foster was associate editor of the Journal of Clinical Investigation from 1972 to 1977 and was editor of Diabetes from 1978 to 1983.  He is co-editor (with J.D. Wilson) of the 7th, 8th and 9th editions of the Williams Textbook of Endocrinology and writes for a number of other textbooks.

Foster was the host of the nationally televised program, "Daniel Foster, MD" for four seasons on the Public Broadcasting Service.  The weekly program was also shown on the British Broadcasting Corporation.  He was appointed to the President's Council on Bioethics by President Bush in January 2002 and was reappointed for a third term in 2005.  He is a board member of the Academy of Medicine, Engineering and Science of Texas and served as president in 2007.

Awards 

Banting Medal   1984
Joslin Medal    1984
Outstanding Alumnus, University of Texas at El Paso   1987
Multiple Outstanding Teacher Awards, Southwestern Medical School (26)
Outstanding Clinician in the Field of Diabetes   1987 (American Diabetes Association)
Upjohn Award for Outstanding Physician Educator in the Field of Diabetes  - 1988
(American Diabetes Association)
Founders Medal, Southern Society for Clinical Investigation – 1992
Lukens Award, 1993 (American Diabetes Assoc., Pennsylvania Affiliate)
Robert H. Williams Distinguished Chair of Medicine Award  - 2001
Great Teacher Award (National Institutes of Health) – 2002
The Daniel W. Martin Science Award – 2005
Eric G. Neilson, M.D., Distinguished Professor Award – 2007 (Assoc of Specialty Professors)
J. Denis McGarry Award for Scientific/Community Excellence (ADA) – 2007
Alpha Omega Alpha Robert J. Glaser Distinguished Teaching Award - 2008

References

External links 
 

1930 births
2018 deaths
American diabetologists
University of Texas at El Paso alumni
Fellows of the American Association for the Advancement of Science
American Presbyterians
University of Texas Southwestern Medical Center faculty
Fellows of the American Academy of Arts and Sciences
Members of the National Academy of Medicine
People from Marlin, Texas